The Rolls-Royce RB.183 Tay is a medium-bypass turbofan engine, developed from the RB.183 Mk 555 Spey core and using a fan scaled directly from the Rolls-Royce RB.211-535E4 to produce versions with a bypass ratio of 3.1:1 or greater. The IP compressor and LP turbine were designed using technology from the RB.211 programme. The engine was first run in August 1984. The Tay 650 had a new HP turbine which incorporated new technology which had been proven with the RB.211-535E4. This engine also had a new combustor for improved durability.
The Tay family is used on a number of airliners and larger business jets, including the Gulfstream IV family, Fokker 70 and Fokker 100, with a later version being used to re-engine Boeing 727-100s.

Variants

Tay 611-8

Originally designated 610-8, all but one training engine have now been converted to 611-8 standard. The newest variant is the 611-8C, which has cast HP1 turbine blades, larger fan from the 650-15, structural by-pass duct and FADEC.

All Tay engines use a 22-blade titanium fan, a 3-stage intermediate-pressure compressor coupled to the fan shaft, a 12-stage high-pressure compressor, a 2-stage high-pressure turbine and a 3-stage low-pressure turbine.

Thrust: 13,850 lbf (62 kN)
Aircraft: Tay 611 entered service in 1987 on the Gulfstream IV/IV-SP, for which it is the exclusive powerplant.

Tay 620-15

The 620-15 is internally identical to the 611-8 and externally similar to the 650-15.

Thrust: 13,850 lbf (62 kN)
Aircraft: Fokker 70 from 1994, Fokker 100 from 1988

Tay 650-15
Thrust: 15,100 lbf (67 kN)
Aircraft: Originally designed to re-engine the BAC One-Eleven (650-14, only two made; both have since been converted to 650-15 standard.), the 650-15 entered service on the Fokker 100 in 1989.

Tay 651-54
The 651-54 is internally identical to the 650-15. The externals and gearbox suit the Boeing 727.

Thrust: 15,400 lbf (69 kN)
Aircraft: Boeing 727-100 from 1992. Conversion from three JT8D-7 to three Tay 651-54 was carried out by the now defunct Dee Howard Aircraft Maintenance Company in San Antonio, Texas, for the United Parcel Service, but all aircraft have since been withdrawn from service. Only one private 727 was converted.

Applications
 BAC 1-11
 Boeing 727-100 QF
 Fokker 70
 Fokker 100
 Gulfstream IV
 Gulfstream G350/G400/G450
 Gulfstream X-54

Specifications (Tay 620-15)

See also

References

Notes

Bibliography

FAA Type Certificate Data Sheet
Gunston, Bill. World Encyclopedia of Aero Engines. Cambridge, England. Patrick Stephens Limited, 1989. 
Rolls-Royce Tay product page

External links

Rolls-Royce Tay

Medium-bypass turbofan engines
Tay
1980s turbofan engines